Dangwa is a 2015 Philippine television drama romantic fantasy series broadcast by GMA Network. It premiered on the network's morning line up from October 26, 2015 to January 29, 2016.

Mega Manila ratings are provided by AGB Nielsen Philippines.

Series overview

Episodes

References

Lists of Philippine drama television series episodes